Rick Reed may refer to:

Rick Reed (advertising agent) (1953–2022), Republican advertising agent
Rick Reed (umpire) (1950–2020), umpire in Major League Baseball
Rick Reed (pitcher) (born 1964), former pitcher in Major League Baseball

See also
Richard Reed (born 1973), British businessman
Richard Reid (disambiguation)
Richard Read (born 1957), American journalist